Marilyn Piperno (born December 9, 1965) is an American Republican Party politician who was elected to the New Jersey General Assembly from the 11th Legislative District in 2021 to take office on January 11, 2022.

Piperno graduated from Pace University and has been a resident of Colts Neck Township.

In the November 2021 general election, Piperno and her running mate Kimberly Eulner, knocked off Democratic incumbents Joann Downey and Eric Houghtaling, both of whom had served three terms in office.

Piperno was one of a record seven new Republican Assemblywomen elected in the 2022 general election, joining seven Republican women incumbents who won re-election that year to the Assembly and Senate.

District 11th
Each of the 40 districts in the New Jersey Legislature has one representative in the New Jersey Senate and two members in the New Jersey General Assembly. The other representatives from the 11th District for the 2022—2023 Legislative Session are:
Senator Vin Gopal (D)
Assemblywoman Kimberly Eulner (R)

References

External links
Legislative webpage

Living people
1965 births
Republican Party members of the New Jersey General Assembly
People from Colts Neck Township, New Jersey
Politicians from Monmouth County, New Jersey
Pace University alumni
Women state legislators in New Jersey
21st-century American politicians
21st-century American women politicians